Les Rivaux de Painful Gulch is a Lucky Luke adventure written by Goscinny and illustrated by Morris. It is the nineteenth book in the series and it was originally published in French in 1962 . English editions of this French series have been published by Dargaud and Cinebook Ltd as The Rivals of Painful Gulch.

In this adventure Lucky Luke tries to sort out a bitter feud between two warring families: the big-eared O'Haras and the big-nosed O'Timmins, whose rivalry causes endless mayhem in the town of Painful Gulch and has ruined the local economy. The inspiration was the Hatfield-McCoy feud.

Synopsis 
In the town of Painful Gulch, the families O'Timmins (big red nose) and O'Hara (big ears) have been fighting for decades, and do not even know why. Lucky Luke is named mayor of the city to try to solve this problem.

Lucky Luke tries to reconcile the two families through a big party with competitions where everything is programmed so that only O'Timmins and O'Hara win. But this party ends in a fist fight. Lucky Luke finally decides to put the men of both families in prison until they decide to make peace. The women of the two families who are tired of this war speed up the rapprochement when they force the two to work together to put out a fire on the O'Hara ranch. Painful Gulch finally knows peace and the two families become great friends.

Characters 

 O'Hara family (with big ears)
 Joshua: Ties with Bigelow O'Timmins in the shooting competition
 Mammy: Pappy O'Hara's wife, she's tired of the rivalry between the two families
 Nathaniel: Wins the rodeo with Montgomery O'Timmins
 Pappy: In a wheelchair, he is angry at the O'Timmins family because they prevent the O'Hara from using the water from the river they control access to
 Zacharias: He is imprisoned by Lucky Luke at the same time as Bigelow O'Timmins
 O'Timmins family (with a big red nose)
 Bigelow: Ties with Joshua O'Hara in the shooting competition
 Emily: wife of "Old Timer" O'Timmins, like Mammy O'Hara, she has enough rivalries and she will send her family to fight against the O'Hara fire
 Montgomery: Wins the rodeo with Nathaniel O'Hara
 Old Timer: Forbids access to the O'Hara River, even if it does not remember the origin of their quarrel; however, he will help transport the water during the fire as a result of his wife's insistence.
 Aloysius O'Timmins-O'Hara (big ears and big red nose): His portrait shows that the families have made good reconciliation; he became mayor of Painful Gulch and senator from Texas to Congress but failed to accede to the United States vice-presidency of which he was an unfortunate candidate.

External links
Lucky Luke official site album index 
Goscinny website on Lucky Luke
Cinebook official website

Comics by Morris (cartoonist)
Lucky Luke albums
1962 graphic novels
Works by René Goscinny